Brompton, originally known as Marye House, is an historic house located on heights overlooking the town of Fredericksburg, Virginia. The house was built in 1838 by John Lawrence Marye. The house was added to the National Register of Historic Places in July 1979.

The house sits atop an area of Fredericksburg known as 'Marye's Heights'.
The town was about 400 yards from Brompton and was a Confederate stronghold against repeated Union Army assaults on the slope during the Battle of Fredericksburg (1862–1863). Confederate General James Longstreet maintained his headquarters at Brompton.

Brompton currently serves as the residence of the President of the University of Mary Washington.

References

External links
Brompton, Sunken Road & Hanover Street, Fredericksburg, Fredericksburg, VA: 3 photos and 3 measured drawings at Historic American Buildings Survey

Historic American Buildings Survey in Virginia
Houses on the National Register of Historic Places in Virginia
Houses completed in 1820
Houses in Fredericksburg, Virginia
National Register of Historic Places in Fredericksburg, Virginia
1838 establishments in Virginia